Heinrich Haussler (born 25 February 1984) is an Australian road racing cyclist of German heritage, who currently rides for UCI WorldTeam . He has won 2 stages in Grand Tours during his career, one at the 2005 Vuelta a España and another at the 2009 Tour de France. He is also a good Classics specialist, registering top results in notable classic races, and was the 2015 Australian national road race champion. He is the winner of the 2022 UAE Al Salam championship.

Biography

Early life
Haussler was born to a German father and Australian mother and raised in the town of Inverell, New South Wales, Australia, before leaving for Germany in 1998 at age 14 to pursue a dream of being a professional cyclist.

Professional career
Haussler turned professional in 2005 and shot to prominence with a stage win in the 2005 Vuelta a España. Haussler took out five wins in 2006 and has had strong classics campaigns since then. He looked set to be a rider of the future in the classics, in 2009 coming in second in both the Tour of Flanders and Milan–San Remo, narrowly beaten in the latter by Mark Cavendish in a photo-finish. He also finished a strong 7th in the 2009 edition of Paris–Roubaix. Haussler's biggest victory so far was the win of Stage 13 in 2009 Tour de France. Haussler lived in Cottbus starting in 1998, and in 2009 in Freiburg im Breisgau.

A dual Australian/German national, Haussler originally raced under a German license. However, in a 2008 interview on CyclingNews.com, he suggested that he would no longer race for Germany as he wished to compete for Australia in the 2010 UCI Road World Championships in Melbourne. When asked what he would do if chosen to race for Germany in the 2008 UCI Road World Championships or at the 2008 Olympics he stated, "I wouldn't take it. If you start for a country at the worlds there is a three-year ban before you can ride for another." The UCI, however, insisted that if Haussler wanted to ride for Australia he would have to give up his German citizenship, which the cyclist said in a November 2009 interview "is not open for debate at the moment".

In July 2010, the Cervélo Test Team announced that Haussler would indeed give up his German citizenship and will ride for Australia in the future. However, a nagging knee injury forced Haussler out of what would have been his international cycling debut for his birth country at the 2010 World Championships.

On 26 August 2010, Haussler's employer, Cervélo Test Team, confirmed rumors that it would cease to exist after the end of the current season.

In the 2012 Tour of California, Haussler was denied victory on the four first stages of the race by Peter Sagan of the  squad, who beat him to the line each time. He would have to settle for second on every one of those stages.

Haussler left  at the end of the 2012 season, and joined the new  team for the 2013 season. In 2015 he won the Australian National Road Race Championships for the first time in his career.

He also began competing in cyclo-cross in 2019, and competed in the 2021 UCI Cyclo-cross World Championships.

Major results

2002
 1st  Time trial, German National Junior Road Championships
2005
 1st Stage 19 Vuelta a España
 3rd Overall Sachsen Tour
 7th Overall Niedersachsen Rundfahrt
 7th Züri-Metzgete
2006
 Vuelta a Murcia
1st  Points classification
1st Stages 1 & 5
 Circuit Franco-Belge
1st Stages 2 & 4
 1st Stage 3 Rheinland-Pfalz Rundfahrt
 3rd Trofeo Mallorca
 6th Clásica de Almería
2007
 1st Stage 1 Critérium du Dauphiné Libéré
 4th Overall Niedersachsen Rundfahrt
1st Stage 5
 10th Rund um den Henninger Turm
2008
 1st Stage 1 Bayern Rundfahrt
 9th Gent–Wevelgem
2009
 1st GP Triberg-Schwarzwald
 Tour de France
1st Stage 13
 Combativity award Stage 13
 Volta ao Algarve
1st Stages 1 & 5
 1st Stage 2 Paris–Nice
 2nd Overall Tour of Qatar
1st  Sprints classification
1st  Young rider classification
 2nd Milan–San Remo
 2nd Tour of Flanders
 2nd Neuseen Classics
 3rd Grand Prix of Aargau Canton
 4th Dwars door Vlaanderen
 4th Sparkassen Giro Bochum
 6th Overall Tour du Poitou-Charentes
1st Stage 5
 6th Paris–Roubaix
 8th Omloop Het Nieuwsblad
2010
 1st Stage 2 Tour de Suisse
 2nd Omloop Het Nieuwsblad
 3rd Grand Prix of Aargau Canton
 9th Overall Tour of Qatar
1st  Sprints classification
2011
 1st Stage 2 Tour of Beijing
 1st  Points classification Paris–Nice
 2nd Overall Tour of Qatar
1st  Points classification
1st Stages 2 & 3
 7th E3 Prijs Vlaanderen
2012
 3rd GP Ouest–France
 4th Omloop Het Nieuwsblad
 7th Vattenfall Cyclassics
2013
 1st Stage 5 Bayern Rundfahrt
 4th Gent–Wevelgem
 4th Paris–Bourges
 6th Tour of Flanders
 6th Paris–Tours
2014
 1st Stage 1 Bayern Rundfahrt
 3rd Grand Prix d'Isbergues
 5th Paris–Tours
2015
 1st  Road race, Australian National Road Championships
 5th Down Under Classic
 7th Paris–Tours
 8th Overall Tour of Qatar
 9th Grand Prix of Aargau Canton
 10th Cadel Evans Great Ocean Road Race
2016
 6th Paris–Roubaix
 7th Milan–San Remo
2019
 10th Dwars door Vlaanderen
2020
 5th Overall Saudi Tour
2021
 4th Omloop Het Nieuwsblad
 10th Paris–Roubaix
2022
 10th Classic Brugge–De Panne

Grand Tour general classification results timeline

Classics & Monuments results timeline

References

External links

 
 Palmares on Cycling Base (French) 

1984 births
Living people
Australian people of German descent
German male cyclists
German Tour de France stage winners
German Vuelta a España stage winners
Cyclists from New South Wales
Australian male cyclists
Tour de Suisse stage winners
People from Inverell